Herbert Gleiter (born 13 October 1938 in Stuttgart) is a German researcher in physics and nanotechnology.

In 1966, he received his Ph.D. in physics from the University of Stuttgart in Germany. He received the Gottfried Wilhelm Leibniz Prize in 1988 for contributions to the field of nanotechnology. He became the Chair Professor of the Institute of Material Science at Saarland University, Germany in 1979. He has also held positions at Harvard University, the Massachusetts Institute of Technology, and the University of Bochum.

In 2004, he was elected a member of the National Academy of Engineering for contributions to the theoretical and practical uses of nanostructured materials.

Since 2012, he is Director and Chair Professor of the 'Herbert Gleiter Institute of Nanoscience' of 'Nanjing University of Science and Technology' of Nanjing in China. In 2019, he received the Advanced Materials Laureate during the 30th IAAM Award Assembly.

References

External links 
Invisible Origins of Nanotechnology: Herbert Gleiter, Materials Science, and Questions of Prestige
prof. H. Gleiter's page at KIT,Germany:https://www.int.kit.edu/staff_herbert.gleiter.php

Living people
20th-century German physicists
University of Stuttgart alumni
Academic staff of Saarland University
Harvard University faculty
Massachusetts Institute of Technology faculty
Foreign Fellows of the Indian National Science Academy
1938 births
Recipients of the Saarland Order of Merit